The Wulai Forestry Life Museum is a museum about forest in Wulai District, New Taipei, Taiwan.

History
The museum was formerly the Wulai Tram Museum or Wulai Log Cart Museum.

Exhibitions
The museum exhibits the history of logging in Wulai area and also its log cart trains for logging transportation.

See also
 List of museums in Taiwan
 Wulai Scenic Train

References

Museums in New Taipei
Museums with year of establishment missing
Geology museums in Taiwan
Wulai District